Crypsotidia wollastoni is a moth of the family Erebidae. It is found in Egypt, Ethiopia, Mali, Niger, Nigeria and Sudan.

References

Moths described in 1901
Crypsotidia